KRZG-CD, virtual channel 35 (UHF digital channel 27), is a low-powered, Class A Dabl-affiliated television station licensed to McAllen, Texas, United States, and serving the Rio Grande Valley. The station is owned by HC2 Holdings. The station's transmitter is located in Palmhurst.

It was formerly a translator of Azteca América affiliate KNWS-LP (channel 64), until it switched to Classic Shows in 2016. Azteca America was also carried on DT4 until January 4, 2021, when ABC affiliate KRGV-TV (channel 5)'s third subchannel dropped its MeTV affiliation and switched to an independent station known as Somos El Valle.

Digital channels
The station's digital signal is multiplexed:

References

External links

Low-power television stations in the United States
Independent television stations in the United States
RZG-CD
Television channels and stations established in 1999
1999 establishments in Texas